The 1969–70 South Carolina Gamecocks men's basketball team represented the University of South Carolina during the 1969–70 men's college basketball season. South Carolina won their first ACC Regular season championship after going a perfect 14-0 in ACC play. Although they won the ACC regular season, they were denied a spot in the NCAA tournament after they lost a controversial ACC Championship tournament game to NC State in double overtime. Junior John Roche won ACC player of the year, and was a first team All American. South Carolina began the season ranked 1st in the AP poll, and finished 6th in both AP and Coaches.

Roster

Schedule

Rankings

References

South Carolina Gamecocks men's basketball seasons
South Carolina
South Carolina
South Carolina